The sixteenth season of the American reality television series, The Real Housewives of Orange County, premiered on December 1, 2021, on Bravo and concluded on April 27, 2022. It is primarily filmed in Orange County, California. Its executive producers are Douglas Ross, Alex Baskin, Thomas Kelly, Brian McCarthy, Apryl Richards, Scott Dunlop and Andy Cohen.

The Real Housewives of Orange County focuses on the lives of Heather Dubrow, Shannon Storms Beador, Gina Kirschenheiter, Emily Simpson, Jen Armstrong and Noella Bergener, with Nicole James  appearing as a Friend of the Housewives.

Production and crew
Douglas Ross, Alex Baskin, Thomas Kelly, Brian McCarthy, Apryl Richards, Scott Dunlop and Andy Cohen are recognized as the series' executive producers; it is produced and distributed by Evolution Media.

In June 2021, it was announced Kelly Dodd Leventhal, Brauwyn Windham-Burke, and Elizabeth Lyn Vargas had departed the series, with Shannon Storms Beador, Gina Kirschenheiter, Emily Simpson and Heather Dubrow returning. Production began in July 2021. In November 2021, the season was announced with December 1, 2021 being confirmed as the premiere date. It was also confirmed that Jen Armstrong and Noella Bergener would be the new housewives joining the cast. Nicole James appeared on the series as a "friend of the housewives", while also departing halfway through the season. Former housewives, Lizzie Rovsek and Jeana Keough made guest appearances during the season.

In July 2022, Bergener and Armstrong both confirmed their exits from the franchise on social media after one season.

Episodes

References

External links

 
 
 

2021 American television seasons
2022 American television seasons
Orange County (season 16)